The Lazio regional election of 2013 took place in Lazio, Italy, on 24–25 February 2013.

Renata Polverini of The People of Freedom (PdL), who was elected president in 2010, was toppled by an expense scandal in October 2012 which led to her resignation.

After that, the candidate of Democratic Party (PD) seemed a shoo-in for victory. In December 2012, the Commissioner of the Province of Rome, Nicola Zingaretti, decided to run as Governor of Lazio for 2013 regional election. As Lazio had been a traditional stronghold of National Alliance party, the former president Francesco Storace, secretary of the national-conservative party The Right and supported by Silvio Berlusconi's coalition, was chosen for the center-right coalition.

The other candidates were Davide Barillari (M5S), who received the 20% of the votes, Giulia Bongiorno (Civic Choice) and Alessandro Ruotolo (Civil Revolution).

Electoral system
The Regional Council is elected with a mixed system: 39 MPs are chosen with a form of proportional representation using a largest remainder method with open lists and a 5% threshold, while 11 MPs are elected with a block voting system with closed lists. One seat is for the elected president.

Results

References

Elections in Lazio
2013 elections in Italy
February 2013 events in Italy